The 45th Parliament of Australia was a meeting of the legislative branch of the Australian federal government, composed of the Australian Senate and the Australian House of Representatives. It met in Canberra from 30 August 2016 to 4 April 2019. The 2016 general election held on 2 July gave the Coalition of the Liberal and National Parties control of the House, albeit with a slimmer majority than the 44th Parliament, allowing their leader Malcolm Turnbull to stay in office as the 29th Prime Minister of Australia. During the term of the parliament, the government slipped into minority due to defections and by-elections. The leadership of the government also changed during the parliament, when Scott Morrison replaced Turnbull as Liberal Leader and Prime Minister in August 2018. The 45th Parliament was officially prorogued by the Governor-General Sir Peter Cosgrove at 8:29 a.m. on 11 April 2019, and the House of Representatives dissolved at 8:30 a.m..

2016 federal election

House of Representatives
At the 2016 federal election, in the 150-seat House of Representatives, the incumbent Coalition government was reelected with 76 seats, a majority of one seat. The Labor opposition won 69 seats. Five other MPs were elected to the crossbench, with the Greens, the Nick Xenophon Team, Katter's Australian Party, and independents Andrew Wilkie and Cathy McGowan winning a seat each.

Senate
In the 76-seat Senate, following the double dissolution election, the Coalition government was returned with 30 seats, and the Labor opposition obtained 26 seats. The crossbench consisted of 20 senators: the Greens winning 9 seats, One Nation winning 4 seats, the Nick Xenophon Team winning 3 seats, and the Liberal Democratic Party, Derryn Hinch's Justice Party, Family First Party and Jacqui Lambie Network each winning one seat.

Membership changes after the election

In the time elapsed between the 2016 election and the following federal election, many parliamentarians resigned from their seats, while some were disqualified by the High Court of Australia. The parliamentary eligibility crisis involving dual citizenship was responsible for a significant portion of these departures, although the cases of Barnaby Joyce and John Alexander only left brief vacancies due to their prompt returns in by-elections. Some individual parliamentarians also made an impact by changing their party membership or independent status.

 1 November 2016: Family First Senator Bob Day resigns after his business collapses.
 3 February 2017: The High Court finds that independent Senator Rod Culleton (formerly of One Nation) was not eligible to be elected under Section 44(ii) of the Constitution due to a criminal conviction.
 10 March 2017: One Nation Senator Peter Georgiou declared elected as a Senator for Queensland by the High Court on a countback to replace Culleton.

 26 March 2017: Georgiou sworn in.
 5 April 2017: The High Court finds that Bob Day was not eligible to be elected under Section 44(v) of the Constitution due to holding a pecuniary interest in an agreement with the Commonwealth.
 19 April 2017: Family First Senator Lucy Gichuhi declared elected as a Senator for South Australia by the High Court on a countback to replace Day.
 9 May 2017: Gichuhi sworn in.
 14 July 2017: Greens Senator and co-deputy leader Scott Ludlam resigns after discovering that he still held New Zealand citizenship, making him ineligible to sit in parliament due to Section 44(i) of the Constitution.
 18 July 2017: Greens Senator and co-deputy leader Larissa Waters resigns after discovering that she held Canadian citizenship by birth, making her ineligible to sit in parliament due to Section 44(i) of the Constitution.
 31 July 2017: Liberal Senator Chris Back of Western Australia resigns.
 16 August 2017: Liberal Slade Brockman is appointed as a Senator for Western Australia to replace Back, being sworn-in the next day.
 27 October 2017: The High Court finds that Greens Senator Scott Ludlam of Western Australia, Greens Senator Larissa Waters of Queensland, One Nation Senator Malcolm Roberts of Queensland, Nationals Senator and deputy leader of the National Party Fiona Nash of New South Wales, and Deputy Prime Minister and leader of the National Party Barnaby Joyce (the member for New England) were all ineligible to be elected to and sit in Parliament under Section 44(i) of the Constitution, due to all holding foreign citizenship.
 31 October 2017: Nick Xenophon Team Senator Nick Xenophon of South Australia resigns.
 2 November 2017: President of the Senate and Liberal Senator Stephen Parry of Tasmania resigns after discovering he held British citizenship by descent, making him ineligible to sit in parliament due to Section 44(i) of the Constitution.
 10 November 2017: Greens Senator Jordon Steele-John of Western Australia, Greens Senator Andrew Bartlett of Queensland, and One Nation Senator Fraser Anning of Queensland are declared elected as Senators by the High Court, to replace Ludlam, Waters, and Roberts (respectively).
 13 November 2017: Liberal MP John Alexander, the member for Bennelong, resigns after discovering he held British citizenship by descent, making him ineligible to sit in parliament due to Section 44(i) of the Constitution.
 13 November 2017: Greens Senator Jordon Steele-John of Western Australia, Greens Senator Andrew Bartlett of Queensland, and One Nation Senator Fraser Anning of Queensland (who immediately resigned from the party to sit as an independent) are sworn in as senators to replace Ludlam, Waters, and Roberts (respectively).
 14 November 2017: Jacqui Lambie Network Senator Jacqui Lambie resigns after discovering that she held British citizenship by descent, making her ineligible to sit in parliament due to Section 44(i) of the Constitution.
 14 November 2017: Rex Patrick of the Nick Xenophon Team is appointed as a Senator for South Australia to replace Nick Xenophon, being sworn-in the next day.
 22 November 2017: Nick Xenophon Team Senator Skye Kakoschke-Moore resigns after discovering that she held British citizenship by descent, making her ineligible to sit in parliament due to Section 44(i) of the Constitution.
 2 December 2017: 2017 New England by-election held. Former Deputy Prime Minister and Leader of the Nationals, Barnaby Joyce, was returned to his former seat after renouncing his New Zealand citizenship.
 16 December 2017: 2017 Bennelong by-election held. Previous Liberal MP for Bennelong John Alexander was returned after renouncing his British citizenship.
 22 December 2017: The High Court declares Liberal Jim Molan elected as a Senator for New South Wales, taking the seat formerly held by Fiona Nash.
 25 January 2018: Labor Senator Sam Dastyari of New South Wales resigns due to being the subject of a Chinese-related donations scandal.
 1 February 2018: Labor MP David Feeney announces his resignation from politics, due to dual citizenship concerns, which takes effect immediately.
 17 March 2018: 2018 Batman by-election held, where Ged Kearney won, retaining the seat for Labor.
 9 May 2018: The High Court rules that ACT Labor Senator Katy Gallagher is ineligible to be elected to and sit in Parliament under Section 44(i) of the Constitution, due to not renouncing British citizenship in time. Following the ruling, Labor MPs Josh Wilson, Susan Lamb, Justine Keay, and Nick Xenophon Team MP Rebekha Sharkie resigns.

Major events
 12 October 2016: Singaporean Prime Minister Lee Hsien Loong addressed a joint sitting of Parliament.
 14 August 2017: Deputy Prime Minister Barnaby Joyce announced that he held dual citizenship with New Zealand, becoming the highest-profile victim of the dual citizenship saga.
 15 November 2017: The result of a nationwide postal vote on same-sex marriage was announced, with a majority yes response.
 26 February 2018: Deputy Prime Minister Barnaby Joyce resigns as leader of the National party. Michael McCormack becomes the next National leader and Deputy Prime Minister.
24 August 2018: Prime Minister Malcolm Turnbull resigns as leader of the Liberal Party after a losing a leadership spill. In the subsequent ballot Scott Morrison defeats Peter Dutton 45 votes to 40. Morrison is sworn in as the 30th Prime Minister of Australia later that evening. Josh Frydenberg is appointed Deputy Leader of the Liberal Party, replacing Julie Bishop.

Major legislation
 7 December 2017: The Marriage Amendment (Definition and Religious Freedoms) Act 2017 was passed, legalising same-sex marriage in Australia.

See also
 46th Parliament of Australia
 Turnbull Government
 Morrison Government

References

Parliament of Australia